The BYD Destroyer 05 (比亚迪驱逐舰05) is a compact sedan manufactured by Chinese automaker BYD Auto. The first plug-in hybrid electric vehicle (PHEV) of BYD's new "Ocean Series" of plug-in electric vehicles, the Destroyer 05 is equipped with the DM-i hybrid technology and heavily based on the older BYD Qin Plus and Qin Pro compact sedans, sharing the exact same wheelbase dimensions and height while featuring completely restyled front and rear end designs.

Overview

Originally unveiled in November 2021 during the Guangzhou Auto Show, the BYD Destroyer 05 was launched on the Chinese car market in March 2022. The Destroyer 05 is a compact sedan and also the first vehicle of BYDs Warship-series, which comprises EVs and PHEVs. The  pure electric range version of the Destroyer 05 supports 25 kW fast charging and charging from 30 percent to 80 percent takes 25 minutes.

The main touch screen can rotate from landscape to portrait.

The Destroyer 05 also comes with the DiPilot intelligent driving assistance system that provides users with advanced driving-assisting functions including active braking, maintaining lanes, adaptive cruise control, and pedestrian recognition and protection.

Powertrain
The BYD Destroyer 05 is powered by BYD's DM-i hybrid EHS system in two variants with two battery sizes.

See also
 BYD Qin

References

Destroyer 05
Plug-in hybrid vehicles
Partial zero-emissions vehicles
Cars introduced in 2021
Sedans
Compact cars
Cars of China
Production electric cars